Acacia jacksonioides is a shrub belonging to the genus Acacia and the subgenus Phyllodineae that is endemic to western Australia.

Description
It has short, divaricate spinose, glabrous branches that often have a white powdery covering that divide to form ribbed branchlets. It produces yellow flowers from July to August.

Distribution
It is native to an area in the Mid West and Wheatbelt regions of Western Australia where it is found on sandplains and lateritic hills and rises growing in gravelly sandy or loamy soils. The disjunct distribution is from around Geraldton in the north west down to around Hyden in the south east where it is often part of shrubland or Eucalyptus woodland communities.

See also
List of Acacia species

References

jacksonioides
Acacias of Western Australia
Plants described in 1976
Taxa named by Bruce Maslin